Necroscia is an Asian genus of stick insects in the family Lonchodidae and tribe Necrosciini. Species have been recorded from South-East Asia.

Species
The Phasmida Species File list:

 Necroscia adspersa (Redtenbacher, 1908)
 Necroscia affinis (Gray, 1835)
 Necroscia analis (Redtenbacher, 1908)
 Necroscia andii Seow-Choen, 2018
 Necroscia aruana Westwood, 1859
 Necroscia biguttacephala Seow-Choen, 2018
 Necroscia brunneri Kirby, 1904
 Necroscia ceres Stål, 1877
 Necroscia chloris Audinet-Serville, 1838
 Necroscia chlorotica Audinet-Serville, 1838
 Necroscia confusa (Redtenbacher, 1908)
 Necroscia connexa (Redtenbacher, 1908)
 Necroscia conspersa Stål, 1877
 Necroscia davidis (Le Guillou, 1841)
 Necroscia dianica Ho, 2017
 Necroscia distincta Brancsik, 1898
 Necroscia edybhaskarai Seow-Choen, 2018
 Necroscia eucerca Stål, 1877
 Necroscia fasciolata Stål, 1877
 Necroscia fatua Stål, 1877
 Necroscia flavescens (Chen & Wang, 1998)
 Necroscia flavogranulosa Günther, 1943
 Necroscia flavoguttulata (Redtenbacher, 1908)
 Necroscia frondosa Bates, 1865
 Necroscia haanii Kirby, 1904
 Necroscia hainanensis (Chen & He, 2002)
 Necroscia hariola (Günther, 1935)
 Necroscia horsfieldii Kirby, 1904
 Necroscia inflexipes (Olivier, 1792)
 Necroscia ingenua (Redtenbacher, 1908)
 Necroscia involutecercata (Redtenbacher, 1908)
 Necroscia ischnotegmina Bragg, 2005
 Necroscia khoonmengi Seow-Choen, 2016
 Necroscia kotatinggia Brock, 1999
 Necroscia lacteipennis Bates, 1865
 Necroscia laterala Seow-Choen, 2018
 Necroscia lehi Seow-Choen, 2016
 Necroscia maculiceps Stål, 1877
 Necroscia malleoformia Hennemann, 2021
 Necroscia manicata (Lichtenstein, 1802)
 Necroscia mista (Chen & He, 2008)
 Necroscia multicolor (Redtenbacher, 1908)
 Necroscia munda (Redtenbacher, 1908)
 Necroscia nasiri Seow-Choen, 2018
 Necroscia nigrofasciata (Redtenbacher, 1908)
 Necroscia notata (Chen & Zhang, 2008)
 Necroscia nuda Seow-Choen, 2018
 Necroscia ohli Seow-Choen, 2017
 Necroscia pallida (Redtenbacher, 1908)
 Necroscia philippina Redtenbacher, 1908
 Necroscia pirithous Westwood, 1859
 Necroscia prasina (Burmeister, 1838)
 Necroscia punctata (Gray, 1835)
 Necroscia randolfae Seow-Choen, 2016
 Necroscia robustior (Redtenbacher, 1908)
 Necroscia rosenbergii Kaup, 1871
 Necroscia simplex (Redtenbacher, 1908)
 Necroscia stali (Redtenbacher, 1908)
 Necroscia sukriadii Seow-Choen, 2018
 Necroscia thisbe Stål, 1877
 Necroscia tibangensis (Günther, 1935)
 Necroscia tonquinensis Kirby, 1904
 Necroscia tujuha Seow-Choen, 2018
 Necroscia virens Stål, 1877
 Necroscia vittata Audinet-Serville, 1838
 Necroscia westwoodi Kirby, 1904
 Necroscia zomproi Seow-Choen, 2016

References

External links
 

Phasmatodea genera
Phasmatodea of Asia
Lonchodidae